Frederic Marlett Bell-Smith  (also known as F. M. Bell-Smith)  (September 26, 1846 – June 23, 1923) was a Canadian landscape painter known for his works of the Rocky Mountains and the Selkirk Range, Quebec and Maine.

Early life
Bell-Smith emigrated to Canada from England in 1866. He had studied painting in England at the South Kensington School of Art and worked as an artist and photographer in Montreal until 1871, when he moved to Toronto. Throughout the 1870s and 1880s he sketched, painted, and taught art classes in Toronto, Hamilton, and London, Ontario. He returned to study in Paris at the Académie Colarossi in 1896.

Painting the Rocky Mountains
In 1886 Bell-Smith seized the opportunity to paint the Canadian Rockies when the Vice-President of the Canadian Pacific Railway (CPR), William Cornelius Van Horne, offered free travel passes to several artists who would sketch and paint vistas of the Canadian west. The CPR wanted artistic works that would heighten public interest in transcontinental travel. Bell-Smith’s stylistically conservative paintings were popular in both eastern Canada and Britain, and he frequently returned to the west to work. He was particularly fond of the natural splendour of the area around Lake Louise and by the turn of the century he made annual trips to the west.

These experiences led Bell-Smith to advocate for a Canadian school of art which drew its uniqueness from the use of the Canadian landscape as its subject matter. Later artists, including Tom Thomson, Emily Carr, and the Group of Seven, contributed to this focus on Canada’s natural environment in art.

Lights of a City Street
Bell-Smith also created many paintings of late Victorian and Edwardian eastern Canada and Britain. One of his most famous and playful paintings is Lights of a City Street, which portrays the intersection of Yonge and King Streets in Toronto in 1894. Bell-Smith depicted himself in the painting as the man buying a newspaper, his son is the man raising his hat, and the policeman is Bill Redford, the constable actually stationed at the corner.

Painting Queen Victoria

In connection with a series of paintings related to the death of Prime Minister Sir John Thompson in 1894, Bell-Smith managed to negotiate a sitting with Queen Victoria, who normally disliked having her portrait taken by anyone aside from a few select photographers. According to Bell-Smith, he followed the advice of a Canadian senator to approach Lord Clinton and Hafiz Abdul Karim about a sitting with the Queen, but received discouraging replies from both men. Bell-Smith was able to obtain sittings with Princesses Beatrice and Louise, whose husband, the Marquis of Lorne, was a former Governor General of Canada and an advocate of Bell-Smith. The Princesses used their influence to persuade the Queen to sit for Bell-Smith. The cordial sitting lasted for over an hour, during which Queen Victoria permitted Bell-Smith to position her as he wished. Princess Louise, an artist herself, offered Bell-Smith advice. The Queen also spoke to her daughters and other attendants about her grandchildren (mostly in German). At the end of the sitting, the Queen approved Bell-Smith’s work. This anecdotal episode demonstrated Bell-Smith’s influence and popularity in Britain. Indeed, Bell-Smith contemplated moving to Britain in the 1890s, but he decided to divide his time between Canada and Europe.

Bell-Smith continued to paint until his death, although he was less active towards the end of his life.

Honours
He made a member of the Royal Canadian Academy of Arts in 1886. He also belonged to the Society of Canadian Artists (1867) which he helped found; the Ontario Society of Artists (1872), of which he was made President (1905-1908); the Royal British Colonial Society of Artists (1908); the Palette Club, Montreal (1892); and the New Water Colour Society, Toronto (1900).

Gallery

References

Bibliography

External links

 
 Frederic Marlett Bell-Smith  at The Canadian Encyclopedia
 HBC Corporate Collections: Art at Hudson's Bay Company

1846 births
1923 deaths
19th-century Canadian painters
Canadian male painters
20th-century Canadian painters
Canadian landscape painters
English emigrants to Canada
Canadian people of British descent
19th-century Canadian male artists
20th-century Canadian male artists
Members of the Royal Canadian Academy of Arts